Ollie Manninen (January 9, 1917 – January 7, 1999) was an American long-distance runner. He competed in the marathon at the 1948 Summer Olympics.

References

External links
 

1917 births
1999 deaths
Athletes (track and field) at the 1948 Summer Olympics
American male long-distance runners
American male marathon runners
Olympic track and field athletes of the United States
Sportspeople from Worcester, Massachusetts
20th-century American people